Daphne blagayana is a species of flowering plant in the genus Daphne. It was discovered in 1837 near Polhov Gradec (now northeastern Slovenia) by Heinrich Freyer and named after the botanist Rihard Blagaj.

Description
The flowers are followed by round pink or white berries.

Chenmical and medicinal properties
Plants of this species have been used for medicinal purposes because they are found to have antioxidant properties, useful in treating skin diseases, toothache, and malaria, and may be used as a natural laxative or anticoagulant. Cytokines that are directly involved in the inflammatory response are reduced, allowing this effect to occur.

References

External links

Flora, oder (Allgemeine) Botanischer Zeitung. Regensberg
USDA, ARS, Germplasm Resources Information Network. Daphne blagayana in the Germplasm Resources Information Network (GRIN), US Department of Agriculture Agricultural Research Service. Accessed on 09-Oct-10.

See also
 Campanula zoysii
 Primula carniolica

blagayana
Flora of Southeastern Europe
Plants described in 1838